Rot-Weiss Essen is a German association football club based in Essen, North Rhine-Westphalia. The club currently plays in the 3. Liga, at the Stadion an der Hafenstraße.

The team won the DFB-Pokal in 1953, and the German championship in 1955. The latter success qualified them to the first season of the European Cup.

History

Early years 
The club was formed as SV Vogelheim on 1 February 1907 out of the merger of two smaller clubs: SC Preussen and Deutsche Eiche. In 1910, Vogelheim came to an arrangement with Turnerbund Bergeborbeck that allowed the two clubs to field a football side. The footballers left in 1913 to set up their own club, Spiel- und Sportverein Emscher-Vogelheim, which changed its name to  Spiel und Sport 1912 after World War I. Finally, in 1923, this side turned again to Turnerbund Bergeborbeck to create Rot-Weiss Essen.

Breakthrough to the Gauliga 
In 1938, RWE broke into top-flight football in the Gauliga Niederrhein, one of sixteen premier divisions formed in the 1933 re-organization of German football under the Third Reich, and came within a point of taking the division title in 1941. In 1943 they played with BV Altenessen as the combined wartime side KSG SC Rot-Weiß Essen/BV 06 Altenessen. The next season this club was in turn joined by BVB Essen, but played only a single match in a stillborn season as World War II overtook the country.

Rise and golden years

The club returned to first division football in the Oberliga West in 1948, where a series of solid performances led to a divisional championship in 1952. The pinnacle of the club's success came with a 2–1 win over Alemannia Aachen in the 1953 DFB-Pokal final, followed by a national championship in 1955 when it beat 1. FC Kaiserslautern 4–3. The following season, Rot-Weiss became the first German side to qualify for the European Cup.

Their performance tailed off after this and RWE became just another mid-table side before they were relegated in 1961. The club then played most of the 1960s as a second division side, but did manage its first appearance in the top-flight Bundesliga in 1966–67. It returned to the Bundesliga for two seasons in 1969–70, and again, for four seasons beginning in 1973–74.

Financial problems and slow decline
Between 1978 and the end of the century, Rot-Weiss was a solid second- or third-tier club, with just one season spent in the Oberliga Nordrhein (IV) in 1998–99. During this period, the club was plagued by financial problems that saw it denied a licence in 1984, 1991, and 1994, leading to relegation from the 2. Bundesliga each time as a result. Bright spots during this period included winning the German amateur championship in 1992 and an appearance in the 1994 DFB-Pokal final, which they lost 1–3 to SV Werder Bremen.

RWE returned to the Regionalliga Nord (III) in 1999, but dropped to the Oberliga (IV) the next season. In 2004, they won promotion back to the 2. Bundesliga, but stumbled to a 17th-place finish and were relegated once again.

In November 2005 Pelé became an honorary club member (membership number 23101940).

The team reappeared in the 2. Bundesliga after winning the Regionalliga Nord in 2006, but narrowly missed staying up when they lost the critical final match of the 2006–07 season 3–0 to Duisburg.

Rot-Weiss became a fourth division side following the introduction of the 3. Liga in 2008 and a fifth division team after insolvency in 2010. They won the fifth level NRW-Liga in 2010–11 and returned to Regionalliga West for the 2011–12 season.

Stadium 
Until 2012 Rot-Weiss used to play in the Georg-Melches-Stadion (capacity 15,000), named in honour of a former club president. In 1956, the team's home field became the first stadium in West Germany to have floodlights.

Since August 2012 RWE has played in the new Stadion Essen (capacity 20,000). The naming rights to the stadium include RWE AG.

Supporters

Rivalries
Fortuna Düsseldorf, Rot-Weiß Oberhausen and Wuppertaler SV are local rivals when they are playing in the same league (as took place in the 2007–08 season). The club's fiercest rivalry is with FC Schalke 04, from nearby Gelsenkirchen, with whom they contest the Ruhrderby.

In the past, the local derbies versus Schwarz-Weiß Essen were big events, sometimes followed by more than 30,000 fans, however since their rivals decline the rivalry has waned in importance. Although often clouded in political terms, the "reds" were left-wing and the "blacks" right-wing, in reality there was no real distinction. The rivalry was more based on geography of the city, a north (RWE) versus south (SWE) city divide. While the reputation of northern Essen has been attached to the working class in the past decades, the south of the city is generally regarded as a wealthier area, inhabited by an upper-middle class.

Friendships
The RWE followers have a strong fan friendship with SV Werder Bremen, while another with Borussia Dortmund ended.

Attendance
Although mostly playing in lower divisions, the club enjoys solid fan support, with an average attendance of better than 6,000 per game.

Honours 
The club's honours:

League 
 German championship
 Champions: 1955
 German amateur championship
 Champions: 1992
 Oberliga West
 Champions: 1952, 1955
 Regionalliga West (II)
 Champions: 1973
 Regionalliga Nord (III)
 Champions: 2004, 2006
 Oberliga Nordrhein (IV)
 Champions: 1985, 1986, 1993, 1999
 Regionalliga West (IV)
 Champions: 2022
 NRW-Liga (V)
 Champions: 2011

Cup 
 DFB-Pokal
 Winners: 1952–53
 Lower Rhine Cup (Tiers 3–5)
 Winners: (10) 1993, 1995, 2002, 2004, 2008, 2011, 2012, 2015, 2016, 2020

Current squad

Out on loan

Notable players

Former coaches 
 Elek Schwartz (1955–1957)
 Fritz Pliska (1965–1967)
 Erich Ribbeck (1967–1968)
 Herbert Burdenski (1969–1971)
 Janos Bedl (1971–1972)
 Horst Witzler (1973)
 Ivica Horvath (1975–1976)
 Diethelm Ferner (1978–1979)
 Rolf Schafstall (1979–1981)
 Rolf Bock (1982–1983)
 Janos Bedl (1983–1984)
 Siegfried Melzig (1984)
 Horst Hrubesch (1986–1987)
 Peter Neururer (1987)
 Horst Franz (1987–1988)
 Siegfried Melzig (1988)
 Hans-Werner Moors (1989–1991)
 Jürgen Röber (1991–1993)
 Wolfgang Frank (1994–1995)
 Rudi Gores (1995–1997)
 Klaus Berge (1998–1999)
 Fritz Fuchs (1999)
 Klaus Berge (1999–2001)
 Harry Pleß (2001–2003)
 Holger Fach (2003)
 Jürgen Gelsdorf (2003–2005)
 Uwe Neuhaus (2005–2006)
 Lorenz-Günther Köstner (2006–2007)
 Heiko Bonan (2007–2008)
 Michael Kulm (2008–2009)
 Ralf Aussem (2009)
 Ernst Middendorp (2009)
 Ralf Aussem (2009–2010)
 Uwe Erkenbrecher (2009–2010)
 Waldemar Wrobel (2010–2014)
 Marc Fascher (2014–2015)
 Jürgen Lucas (2015)
 Markus Reiter (2015)
 Jan Siewert (2015–2016)
 Sven Demandt (2016–2017)
 Argirios Giannikis (2017–2018)

References

External links 
  

 
Football clubs in Germany
Football clubs in North Rhine-Westphalia
Association football clubs established in 1907
Sport in Essen
1907 establishments in Germany
Bundesliga clubs
2. Bundesliga clubs